The Goseong Dinosaur Museum is in South Korea. The museum presents dinosaur footprint fossils.

External links 

 Museum information

Dinosaur museums
Museums in South Gyeongsang Province
Natural history museums in South Korea